Jean Elise Schaffer is an American physician-scientist. She is a Senior Investigator at the Joslin Diabetes Center, where she also serves as Associate Research Director, and she is Professor of Medicine at Harvard Medical School. Her work focuses on fundamental mechanisms of metabolic stress responses and the pathophysiology of diabetes complications.

Education 
Schaffer completed an A.B. in biochemistry, phi beta kappa and magna cum laude from Harvard College. As an undergraduate, she performed her thesis work with Richard I. Morimoto Ph.D. in the laboratory of Matthew Meselson, Ph.D. She earned an M.D., cum laude from Harvard Medical School. Schaffer completed an internship and residence in medicine at Brigham and Women's Hospital, and clinical and research fellowship in cardiology at Beth Israel Hospital. She carried out postdoctoral training with Harvey Lodish, PhD at the Whitehead Institute at Massachusetts Institute of Technology, during which time she cloned the first member of the fatty acid transport protein family.

Career 
In 1995, Schaffer joined the faculty at Washington University School of Medicine in St Louis. She rose through the ranks and was appointed as the inaugural Virginia Minnich Distinguished Professor of Medicine. In addition to leading a laboratory focused on metabolic disease research, she directed the NIDDK-funded Diabetes Research Center at Washington University from 2008-2019. Her laboratory discovered that disruption of specific small nucleolar RNAs protects against lipid-induced cell death and alters metabolism, work that has provided a new understanding of how nutrient signals influence cellular homeostasis through non-coding RNAs. Schaffer’s contributions to the fields of lipid metabolism and metabolic stress have been recognized by American Society for Clinical Investigation, American Association for the Advancement of Science, Association of American Physicians and American Society for Biochemistry and Molecular Biology. In 2019, Schaffer was recruited to the Joslin Diabetes Center at Harvard Medical School

Awards and honors 

1993	Katz Basic Science Research Prize, American Heart Association

1995	Heinrich Wieland Prize

2003	American Society for Clinical investigation

2008	Fellow of the American Association for the Advancement of Science

2012	Association American of Physicians

2017	Harold Rifkin Award, Albert Einstein College of Medicine 

2018	Robert P. Hebbel Award, University of Minnesota

2020	Avanti Award in Lipids, American Society for Biochemistry and Molecular Biology

References 

Living people
Year of birth missing (living people)
Harvard College alumni
Harvard Medical School alumni
Harvard Medical School faculty
Washington University School of Medicine faculty
American cardiologists
Women cardiologists
20th-century American physicians
21st-century American physicians
20th-century American women physicians
21st-century American women physicians
American diabetologists
Women medical researchers
Fellows of the American Association for the Advancement of Science